Yasynivka is an urban-type settlement in Makiivka Municipality, Donetsk Raion of Donetsk Oblast in eastern Ukraine. Population:

Demographics
Native language as of the Ukrainian Census of 2001:
 Ukrainian 62.8%
 Russian 37.03%
 Belarusian 0.14%

References

Urban-type settlements in Donetsk Raion